Neobythitinae is a subfamily of cusk eel from the family Ophidiidae.

Genera
The following genera make up the subfamily:

 Genus Abyssobrotula
 Genus Acanthonus 
 Genus Alcockia
 Genus Apagesoma
 Genus Barathrites
 Genus Barathrodemus
 Genus Bassogigas
 Genus Bassozetus
 Genus Bathyonus
 Genus Benthocometes
 Genus Dannevigia 
 Genus Dicrolene
 Genus Enchelybrotula
 Genus Epetriodus
 Genus Eretmichthys
 Genus Glyptophidium
 Genus Holcomycteronus
 Genus Homostolus
 Genus Hoplobrotula
 Genus Hypopleuron 
 Genus Lamprogrammus
 Genus Leptobrotula
 Genus Leucicorus
 Genus Luciobrotula
 Genus Mastigopterus
 Genus Monomitopus
 Genus Neobythites
 Genus Neobythitoides
 Genus Penopus
 Genus Petrotyx
 Genus Porogadus
 Genus Pycnocraspedum
 Genus Selachophidium 
 Genus Sirembo
 Genus Spectrunculus
 Genus Spottobrotula
 Genus Tauredophidium
 Genus Typhlonus
 Genus Ventichthys
 Genus Xyelacyba

References

Ophidiidae